The 1942 United States Senate election in Maine was held on September 14, 1942. Incumbent Republican U.S. Senator Wallace White was re-elected to a third term over Fulton J. Redman.

Republican primary

Candidates
Wallace H. White Jr., incumbent Senator since 1931

Results
Senator White was unopposed for re-nomination.

Democratic primary

Candidates
Fulton J. Redman, newspaper editor and perennial candidate from Bar Harbor

Results
Redman was unopposed for the Democratic nomination.

General election

Results

See also 
 1942 United States Senate elections

References

Notes

Maine
1942